The Whewell equation of a plane curve is an equation that relates the tangential angle with arclength, where the tangential angle is the angle between the tangent to the curve and the -axis, and the arc length is the distance along the curve from a fixed point. These quantities do not depend on the coordinate system used except for the choice of the direction of the -axis, so this is an intrinsic equation of the curve, or, less precisely, the intrinsic equation. If a curve is obtained from another by translation then their Whewell equations will be the same.

When the relation is a function, so that tangential angle is given as a function of arclength, certain properties become easy to manipulate. In particular, the derivative of the tangential angle with respect to arclength is equal to the curvature. Thus, taking the derivative of the Whewell equation yields a Cesàro equation for the same curve.

The concept is named after William Whewell, who introduced it in 1849, in a paper in the Cambridge Philosophical Transactions. In his conception, the angle used is the deviation from the direction of the curve at some fixed starting point, and this convention is sometimes used by other authors as well. This is equivalent to the definition given here by the addition of a constant to the angle or by rotating the curve.

Properties
If the curve is given parametrically in terms of the arc length , then  is determined by

 

which implies

 

Parametric equations for the curve can be obtained by integrating:

 

Since the curvature is defined by

 

the Cesàro equation is easily obtained by differentiating the Whewell equation.

Examples

References

 Whewell, W. Of the Intrinsic Equation of a Curve, and its Application. Cambridge Philosophical Transactions, Vol. VIII, pp. 659-671, 1849. Google Books
 Todhunter, Isaac. William Whewell, D.D., An Account of His Writings, with Selections from His Literary and Scientific Correspondence. Vol. I. Macmillan and Co., 1876, London. Section 56: p. 317.
 
 Yates, R. C.: A Handbook on Curves and Their Properties, J. W. Edwards (1952), "Intrinsic Equations" p124-5

External links
 

Curves